Antonio Randi (11 March 1921 – 6 April 1998) was an Italian wrestler. He competed in the men's freestyle featherweight at the 1952 Summer Olympics.

References

External links
 

1921 births
1998 deaths
Italian male sport wrestlers
Olympic wrestlers of Italy
Wrestlers at the 1952 Summer Olympics
People from Faenza
Mediterranean Games gold medalists for Italy
Mediterranean Games medalists in wrestling
Competitors at the 1951 Mediterranean Games
Sportspeople from the Province of Ravenna
20th-century Italian people